is the world's oldest eau de Cologne and perfume factory. It traces its origins to a luxury goods retail business founded in 1709 in Cologne by Giovanni Battista Farina (German: Johann Baptist Farina), who was subsequently joined in the business by his younger brother, Giovanni Maria Farina (German: Johann Maria Farina). The short form 'Farina gegenüber' and the French name 'Jean Marie Farina vis-à-vis de la place Juliers' were also commonly used over a long period of time. The company's logo is a red tulip.

The company is still run by the founding family's descendants, who are the eighth generation of family members. The company has held royal warrants as purveyors of perfume to the German, French, Italian, Swedish, Russian and British royal families. The company headquarters and birthplace of eau de Cologne are both to be found at Farina House in Cologne, Germany, where the Farina Fragrance Museum is also located.

The company’s history

The Johann Maria Farina (I) years, 1709–1766

Ancestors 
The founding of Farina House dates back to the early 18th century. In June 1709, Johann Baptist Farina travelled to Cologne, where his younger brother Johann Maria Farina had been working for their uncle since 1708. On 13 July 1709, Johann Baptist Farina (Italian: Giovanni Battista Farina) founded the company G.B. Farina and, from that point on, started his book-keeping, which has never been interrupted since.

On 17 July 1709, Johann Baptist Farina registered as a new resident at Cologne town hall and on the 24th was granted free citizenship. In those days, this procedure was necessary for a settler to set up a private business. With the support of his uncle, who was a member of the Maastricht government, and the salesman Johann Maria Farina (originally named Giovanni Maria Farina), Johann Baptist Farina (II) signed on 1 August 1709 a twelve-year contract to rent a building at the junction of the streets Großen Bottengassen and Goldschmidts, now known as Unter Goldschmidt.

Johann Baptist and his brother-in-law, Franz Balthasar Borgnis, then founded 'Farina & Compagnie', which later developed into 'Gebrüder Farina & Comp.' (English: Farina Brothers and Co.) after Johann Maria Farina (I) and Carl Hieronymus Farina joined in 1714 and 1716. The Farina company sold a wide range of luxury items, such as lace, handkerchiefs, silk stockings, wigs, feathers, tobacco boxes, sealing wax and face powder that one would have expected to find in a shop run by Italians.

Johann Maria Farina House 
After 1716, Gebrüder Farina & Comp. experienced a number of financial difficulties, which led to Franz Balthasar Borgnis’ and Carl Hieronymus Farina’s departures. This left Johann Baptist Farina (II) and Johann Maria Farina (I) at the head of the company, which was subsequently named 'Fratelli Farina' (English: Farina Brothers). In the years that followed, the two brothers concentrated on transporting goods, an enterprise which, however, did not prove to be successful.

Johann Baptist Farina (II) died on 24 April 1732. In the subsequent months, Johann Maria Farina (I) carried out an inventory before renaming the business 'Johann Maria Farina', a name which has remained unchanged ever since. After this change, business improved, as he wrote in a letter addressed to his relative, Francesco Barbieri, back in Italy:

After having been at the head of this business for less than two years, Johann Maria Farina was granted the right to citizenship by the city of Cologne. The following decades, the 1730s and 1740s, happened to be very prosperous ones, during which he concentrated his efforts on the business of delivery, and it was only at the beginning of the 1760s that the perfume business took centre stage.

An astounding fragrance 
In 1703, long before he joined his brother to found 'Farina & Compagnie' in 1714, Johann Maria Farina (I) put his skills to work and created a fragrance that was to become a great success. Indeed, the Italian perfume maker gave birth to a whole new type of complex fragrance, which combined several essences with pure alcohol, an innovative combination. The fragrance was fresh, which contrasted to most of the known heavy scents of the time, such as cinnamon oil, sandalwood oil or musk.

In 1708, Johann Maria Farina wrote a letter to his brother, Johann Baptist Farina, in which he describes his perfume as follows:

“I have created a perfume which is reminiscent of a spring morning following a soft shower where fragrances of wild narcissi combine with that of sweet orange flowers. This perfume refreshes me and stimulates both my senses and imagination”.

The top note is essentially composed of citrus fruits, Bergamot being the main component. The latter has to be picked whilst still green, as only the unripe peel is suitable for the production of Farina’s perfume. Furthermore, the fact that only natural essences were and still are used means that the perfume maker must blend and combine various vintages to obtain a constant fragrance. Plants react to various climatic changes, thus causing their scent to vary. Farina was meticulous in this regard and regularly set aside small samples of his perfume which were then used as comparisons to ensure his perfume did not undergo any changes. Some samples exist today.

Eau de Cologne takes over the European market 
Initially, Farina limited the sale of his perfume to Cologne and Frankfurt’s trade centre. The first delivery dates back to 1716, when Farina sent 12 bottles to a Madame Billy in Aachen.
       
From 1730 onwards, Farina’s list of customers expanded at a great pace and, according to records, 3,700 bottles were delivered to a total of 39 addresses between 1730 and 1739. His perfume, which delighted the upper nobility, soon became a royal and imperial favourite. By 1740, eau de Cologne was a great success and was sold in Rouen, Paris, Strasburg, Magdeburg, Trier, Wesel, Kleve, Lyon, Vienna, Amsterdam, The Hague, Liège, Lille, Aachen, Düsseldorf, Bonn, Braunschweig, Frankfurt, Leipzig, Augsburg, Stuttgart, Bamberg, Mainz, Warsaw and Koblenz.

In a letter dated 9 April 1747, Farina explains that his perfume is known throughout Europe.

Packaging, quality seal and advertising 
Johann Maria Farina (I) had his eau de Cologne filled into long bottles, the so-called Rosoli bottle. Both full measures (8 ounces) and half measures of eau de Cologne were sold and, in the 1760s, one could also find quarter bottles. Half bottles were most common and a dozen of them would have been sold for 6 Reichsthaler or 9 Guilder. The items were initially sold individually, whereas later Farina delivered his perfume in boxes of 4, 6, 8, 12 and 18 bottles.

The red seal, which bore the family crest and which appeared on all products, was a sign of quality and authenticity. Each delivery was also accompanied by a signed document on which the directions for use were printed. According to the document, eau de Cologne was not exclusively intended for exterior use. It was described as good for dental hygiene, efficient against bad breath and a way of avoiding infectious diseases. In August 1785, a certain Mrs Duplessis from Nogent enquired whether eau de Cologne could in any way help her paralysed husband. In his response, Johann Maria Farina (III) suggested she dampen some pieces of cloth in the perfume before applying them to her husband's aching limbs and recommended she add 50 drops of eau de Cologne to his weekly drinking water. The letter ended as follows: 
“At least you run no risk of harming him in any way”. However, the healing properties were removed from the instruction leaflet in 1811 and used only in advertisements. In 1803, the signature that had featured on the information leaflet was replaced by a stamp, which then made it possible to enclose a leaflet with each individual bottle.

The company under Johann Maria Farina (III), 1766–1792

Notable customers

Royalty and aristocrats

Others

Gallery

References

Bibliography
Sources  
The Farina archives are currently being held in section 33 of the Rhenish Westphalian economic archives (Rheinisch-Westfälisches Wirtschaftsarchiv). Several documents have been digitised and are available in Wikimedia Commons and in Wikisource.
Instruction leaflet dating back to 1811 (in German).
 Delivery of Eau de Cologne to the French Empress Marie-Louise:
 Extract from the Farina House order book dated 6 November 1811 (in German)
 Letter from Farina to his commission agent in Paris, Delaporte, date 9 November 1811 (in French)
 Ingrid Haslinger: Kunde–Kaiser. Die Geschichte der ehemaligen k. u. k. Hoflieferanten, Schroll, Vienna, 1996. 
 Florian Langenscheidt (ed.): Deutsches Marken-Lexikon, pages 396–397, Deutsche Standards, Köln 2008. 
 Florian Langenscheidt (ed.): Lexikon der deutschen Familienunternehmen

Literature related to the company
 Hermann Schaefer: Geschichte, Markenschutz, Nachahmer, Rechtsprechung. Aus dem Archiv des Originalhauses Johann Maria Farina gegenüber dem Jülichs-Platz gegr. 1709, Cologne, 1929.
 Wilhelm Mönckmeier: Die Geschichte des Hauses Johann Maria Farina gegenüber dem Jülichsplatz in Köln gegründet 1709, revised by Hermann Schaefer, Berlin (Detailed information concerning the history of the company from its beginnings to 1914 as well as a cursory overview of the period between 1914 and 1933), 1934.
 Markus Eckstein: Eau de Cologne: Auf den Spuren des berühmten Duftes, Cologne, 2006. .
 Verena Pleitgen: Die Entwicklung des betriebswirtschaftlichen Rechnungswesens von 1890 bis 1940 bei Farina, 
 Marita Krauss: Die Königlich Bayerischen Hoflieferanten. Wo der König Kunde war, Munich, 2008. 
 Astrid Küntzel: Fremde in Köln Integration und Ausgrenzung zwischen 1750 und 1814, Cologne, 2008. 
 Rudolf Amelunxen: Das Kölner Ereignis, Ruhrländische Verlagsgesellschaft, Essen, 1952.
 Bernd Ernsting; Ulrich Krings: Der Ratsturm, pp. 506–507, J. P. Bachem Verlag, Cologne, 1996
 Rheinisch-westfälische Wirtschaftsbiographien 1953, chapter 7, pp. 161–198
 Jürgen Wilhelm (ed.): Das große Köln-Lexikon, Greven Verlag, Cologne, 2005. 
 Klara van Eyll: Die Geschichte der unternehmerischen Selbstverwaltung in Köln 1914–1997, p. 163, 234 & 235, Cologne RWWA (Rheinisch-Westfälisches Wirtschaftsarchiv), 1997
 Robert Steimel: Kölner Köpfe, Steimel Verlag, Cologne, 1958.

Technical literature
 Giovanni Fenaroli; L. Maggesi: Acqua di Colonia. In: Rivista italiana essenze, profumi, piante offizinali, olii vegetali, saponi, p. 42, 1960.
 Francesco La Face: Le materie prime per l'acqua di colonia. À: Relazione al Congresso di Sta. Maria Maggiore. 1960.
 Sébastien Sabetay: Les Eaux de Cologne Parfumée. Sta. Maria Maggiore Symposium, 1960
 Frederick V. Wells: Variations on the Eau de Cologne Theme, Sta. Maria Maggiore Symposium, 1960
 Frederick V. Wells;  Marcel Billot: Perfumery Technology: Art, Science, Industry, p. 25 & 278, Horwood Books: Chichester, 1981. 

 Publications related to Farina 
 Friedrich Gildemeister; Eduard Hoffmann: Die aetherischen Oele, 1st ed., Julius Springer, Berlin, 1899.
 Ludger Kremer; Elke Ronneberger-Sibold (eds.): Names in Commerce and Industry: Past and Present. In: Pd. Dr. Christian Weyers (2008), Brand name, Herkunftsangabe und Freizeichen im Grenzbereich zwischen Proprium und Appellativum, pp. 45–60, Logos Verlag: Berlin 

Fiction
 Honoré de Balzac: Histoire de la Grandeur et de la Décadence de César Birotteau, Marchand Parfumeur, Adjoint au Maire du deuxième Arrondissement de Paris, Chevalier de la Légion-d'honneur, etc., Paris, 1837
 George Meredith: Farina, Chapman and Hall Ltd., London, 1894

External links

Farina Fragrance Museum website 
Interview with CEO Johann Maria Farina at Basenotes.net

Bavarian Royal Warrant holders
Belgian Royal Warrant holders
British Royal Warrant holders
French Royal Warrant holders
German brands
Innenstadt, Cologne
Italian Royal Warrant holders
Manufacturing companies based in Cologne
Perfume houses
Purveyors to the Court of Sweden
Purveyors to the Imperial and Royal Court
1709 establishments in the Holy Roman Empire
Companies established in 1709